Pterocarpus santalinoides is a tree species in the legume family (biology) (Fabaceae); it is locally known as mututi.

It has a remarkable bi-continental distribution, native to tropical western Africa (Benin, Burkina Faso, Cameroon, Gambia, Ghana, Guinea, Guinea-Bissau, Ivory Coast, Liberia, Mali, Nigeria, Senegal, Sierra Leone, Togo) and also to South America (Brazil, Colombia, French Guiana, Guyana, Paraguay, Peru, Suriname, Trinidad and Tobago, and Venezuela).

It grows to 9–12 m tall, with a trunk up to 1 m in diameter and flaky bark. The leaves are pinnate, 10–20 cm long, with 5–9 leaflets. The flowers are orange-yellow, produced in panicles. The fruit is a pod 3.5–6 cm long, with a wing extending three-quarters around the margin.

Footnotes

References
  (2005): Pterocarpus santalinoides. Version 10.01, November 2005. Retrieved 2008-NOV-01.
 
  [2008]: AgroForestryTree Database – Pterocarpus santalinoides. Retrieved 2008-NOV-01.

santalinoides
Least concern plants
Taxonomy articles created by Polbot